Ciechanów Voivodeship (1793) in Poland was created during the Grodno Sejm in November 23 1793. It was not fully organised because of the start of Kościuszko Uprising in 1794.

The Voivodeship consisted of three parts:
 Ciechanów Land
 Zakroczym Land
 Różan Land

References 
Volumina legum t. 10 Konstytucje Sejmu Grodzieńskiego z 1793 roku, Poznań 1952

Voivodeships of the Polish–Lithuanian Commonwealth